Francesco Neffat (Franjo Nefat), was an antifascist, politician and blacksmith from Pula, who contributed to the liberation of Pula during World War 2, and to the annexation of Istria to Croatia. He was the first president of the Norodnog odbora of Pula (Chief Executive of Pula) from 1947 to 1954.

Biography
In 1924 Neffat entered the Italian Communist Youth Federation, the youth organization of the Communist Party of Italy, and in 1926 he entered the Communist Party of Italy; in the same year, on 1 May, he distributed leaflets and waved the red flag in the civic high school, now the Humanities Department of the University of Pula.

After spending two years in the Italian navy in La Spezia (from 1928 to 1930), he returned to Pula. Neffat refused to enroll in a fascist union, and thereafter had to change jobs frequently, even though he was a respected blacksmith. Between 1936 and 1938 he worked for the organization of a party in a cement factory in Pula, but was arrested when the police discovered the organization and the members of the KPI, who on May 28, 1938 distributed printed leaflets against solidarity with fascist Spain. Nefat was sentenced to 4 years in prison.

By profession a labor worker, after the fall of fascism in 1943 he entered the Yugoslav resistance. On 13 September 1943 he was among the signatories of the Pazin Declaration, drawn up by Monsignor Božo Milanović, which asked for the annexation of Istria to Yugoslavia and which was submitted to the Paris Peace Conference.

On May 5, 1945, the battle for Pula ended with the fall of Muzil, which was accelerated by two Pula citizens, the communist Romano Kumar and socialist Steno Califfi, who managed to find the pipes that supplied Muzil with water. Neffat entered the city together with the Yugoslav army and on 5 May he was appointed president of the CLN of Pola, holding the municipality of the city in the first period of Yugoslav administration. Neffat croatized his name into Franjo Nefat.

He maintained the administration of the city for a month and a half, until June 20, when it passed under the Anglo-American administration. On February 10, 1947, with the definitive passage of Pula to Yugoslavia, he returned as administrator of the city as President of the national council and held this position until 1954.

In 2012, the City of Pula dedicated a street to him.

Sources
 Francesco Neffat, The political struggle in Pola, in: 1948 Almanac of the Italians of Istria and Fiume, pp. 179 - 183, 1948, Pula

References

1908 births
1990 deaths
Italian partisans
Yugoslav Partisans
Croatian politicians